Erskineville Kings is a 1999 Australian drama film directed and produced by Alan White. The film was produced by Radical Media made for Palace Films on a minimal budget. It was released on 1 January 1999.

The lead actor, Hugh Jackman, in his film debut, won the Film Critics Circle of Australia award for Best Male Actor,

Plot
The film deals with the story of two brothers. Barky (Marty Denniss) is 25 years old and returning to Sydney after two years of living in the northern sugar cane growing areas. He has returned home to attend the funeral of his father. The film begins with Barky's arrival at Central station at dawn, seeking the whereabouts of his brother, Wace (Hugh Jackman). We learn from flashbacks that he left home two years ago to escape the clutches of his father's violent rages. Wace, the older brother, is not too happy about Barky's prolonged absence, having been left to manage looking after the father in his last years of life. After walking through the streets he finds an old mate of his, Wayne (Joel Edgerton), who assures him of the location of his brother. He succeeds in finding his brother through the help of Wayne and friends, who all end up at a pub where it is revealed that Barky and Wace's mother left the family fifteen years earlier and that Wace hastened his father's death after he was struck down by a stroke. Barky also crosses paths with his ex-girlfriend, Lanny, and manages to rekindle the relationship.

Cast
 Marty Denniss as Barky
 Hugh Jackman as Wace
 Joel Edgerton as Wayne
 Andrew Wholley as Coppa
 Leah Vandenberg as Lanny
 Aaron Blabey as Trunny
 Paul Dawber as Father

Production
The film was shot in the streets of Newtown, Millers Point, New South Wales, and Chippendale, New South Wales, including inside Bob Gould's bookshop in Newtown and the Hollywood Hotel in Surry Hills. The title of the movie refers to the King's Hotel, a fictional hotel in which most of the movie takes place.

Box office
Erskineville Kings grossed $183,691 at the box office in Australia.

See also
 Cinema of Australia

References

External links
 

1999 films
1999 drama films
Australian drama films
Films set in Sydney
Films shot in Sydney
1990s English-language films
1990s Australian films